Jacques Louis Marin DeFrance (22 October 1758 – 12 November 1850) was a French malacologist.

Works 
Tableau Des Corps Organisés Fossiles: Précédé De Remarques Sur Leur Pétrification, Paris 1824, gallica

References 

 

1758 births
1850 deaths
French malacologists